Valiant is a 2005 computer-animated comedy film produced by Vanguard Animation, Ealing Studios and Odyssey Entertainment, and released by Entertainment Film Distributors in the United Kingdom on March 25, 2005, and by Walt Disney Pictures in the United States on August 19, 2005. Set in May of the year 1944, it tells the story of a group of war pigeons during World War II. The film is based on a story by George Webster, and inspired by true stories of hundreds of pigeons that helped the soldiers in the war.

Plot 

In May 1944, five years after the declaration of World War II, three Royal Homing Pigeon Service war pigeons are flying across the English Channel with the White Cliffs of Dover in sight, carrying vital messages to Great Britain. Despite the poor weather conditions the pigeons have nearly reached their destination. They are, however, suddenly ambushed and attacked by a Nazi German enemy peregrine falcon named General Von Talon; two of the pigeons are instantly killed, yet the third, Mercury, is taken as a prisoner of war.

Elsewhere, a small wood pigeon named Valiant is watching an Allied forces propaganda film in his local bar (an overturned rowing boat) in West Nestington. He is best friends with Felix, an old seagull with a peg leg and the local barman. Wing Commander Gutsy, a war hero, flies into the bar, informing everyone that signups are scheduled the next day in Trafalgar Square, London. Valiant flies off to London, bidding his mother and Felix goodbye. In London, Valiant meets an unhygienic slacker pigeon named Bugsy, who is being hunted by two magpie thugs, after having tricked them at a shell game. In order to escape the thugs, he signs up with Valiant.

The recruits, Valiant, Bugsy, Lofty, an intellectual red pigeon, and Toughwood and Tailfeather, two muscular but dim-witted twin brothers, form Royal Homing Pigeon Service Squad F, and are sent to a recruit training facility. Under the command of Sergeant Monty, who declares that he will toughen them up for the RHPS, the training begins. Meanwhile, Von Talon and his henchmen, Cufflingk and Underlingk, try numerous attempts to discover the message's departure location. However, Mercury refuses to tell, despite the tortures inflicted upon him, such as irritating him with yodeling music and injecting him with truth serum, before Mercury accidentally reveals the location: Saint-Pierre.

Valiant develops a crush on Victoria, the camp's nursing dove. Eventually, Gutsy arrives and tells the Sergeant that the recruits need to leave the next morning, despite their training being vastly incomplete. Bugsy, however, decides not to go on the "highly dangerous" mission and flees the camp that night. Next morning Valiant and the others prepare to leave, and start to board a Handley Page Halifax bound for occupied France, but not before Bugsy shows up at the last second. The journey quickly becomes dangerous, as the plane is caught in an anti-aircraft attack. Their plane sustains heavy damage and the pigeons soon have to bail out, in boxes equipped with parachutes. The pigeons are dropped from the plane; however, a technical malfunction causes Gutsy's box to fail to deploy. The plane crash-lands nearby, but then explodes, presumably killing Gutsy.

In France, the pigeons meet Charles de Girl and Rollo, two mice from the French Resistance, Mouse Division, who lead them to Saint-Pierre, where they receive the message they have been ordered to deliver. They soon come under attack by Von Talon's henchmen, resulting in Bugsy and the message being captured. Von Talon takes the message from Bugsy and decides to lock him up and kill him later, planning to personally deliver the message to Der Fuehrer himself. Valiant and the troops follow Bugsy to the falcon's bunker, where they discover that Gutsy has survived the plane crash. Valiant takes advantage of his small size and sneaks into the bunker through the gun barrel, retrieves the message, and frees Bugsy and Mercury. Unfortunately, the falcons witness the escape and give chase. As Gutsy, Bugsy, Mercury, Toughwood, Tailfeather and Lofty fight off Cufflingk and Underlingk, Valiant flies to London to deliver the message, followed by Von Talon.

After a climactic chase, Valiant hides until he is caught by Von Talon. With the help of Felix and the resident pigeons, Valiant outwits Von Talon by getting a giant hook caught on his medals, leaving him to be beaten by the water wheel. Valiant delivers the message, and upon its arrival in the war room, a change of plans is made; the Allied fleet will land in Normandy. After receiving the Dickin Medal, Squad F returns to the local bar in West Nestington, where Valiant reunites and shares a romantic kiss with Victoria. A message is then displayed commending the animals that saved thousands of lives during World War II.

Voice cast 
 Ewan McGregor as Valiant, a plucky and optimistic wood pigeon. Although he is the smallest of the war pigeon squad, he is the bravest.
 Ricky Gervais as Bugsy, a slovenly but friendly pigeon who becomes Valiant's close friend
 Pip Torrens as Lofty Thaddeus Worthington, a red scholarly pigeon
 Dan Roberts as Tailfeather 
 Brian Lonsdale as Toughwood
 John Cleese as Mercury
 Olivia Williams as Victoria, a beautiful and kind nursing dove and Valiant's love interest.
 John Hurt as Felix, an old seagull with a peg leg and Valiant's friend.
 Annette Badland as Elsa, Valiant's doting mother who at first doesn't want her "little egg" to go to war, but lets Valiant go to be the hero he needs to be.
 Jim Broadbent as Sergeant Monty, the gruff drill sergeant who puts the recruits through strainious training to prepare for fighting against Von Talon.
 Hugh Laurie as Wing Commander Gutsy,
 Tim Curry as General Von Talon, a cruel German peregrine falcon. He stands out with a big eyepatch over his left eye.
 Rik Mayall as Cufflingk, 
 Sharon Horgan as Charles de Girl
 Jonathan Ross as Big Thug
 Joe Ranft as Additional Voice
 Marshall Efron as Additional Voice

Themes  
Valiant takes the Second World War as its backdrop, and thus the film has various factual references to World War II. McGregor himself called it "a good old-fashioned war movie." The film's use of World War II imagery is apparent throughout; for instance, the villainous characters in the film hold obvious links to the Nazis, although Nazism is never specifically mentioned, nor are Nazi symbols ever overtly visually depicted – edited symbols are, however, discreetly inserted. For example, General Von Talon wears a large Reichsadler badge that depicts the German eagle, taken from the coat of arms of Germany. Yet this version, unlike the Hoheitszeichen (Nazi Germany's national insignia), has the eagle grasping two bones, whereas the Hoheitszeichen depicts the eagle clutching a swastika. Furthermore, the film's primary antagonist, Von Talon, holds specific links to Adolf Hitler. For example, Von Talon states whilst holding Mercury as a prisoner of war that he would not eat Mercury, as he is a vegetarian, a direct reference to Adolf Hitler's vegetarianism.

Production

Development 

179 modelers, animators, shaders, texturers began work on Valiant at Ealing Studios, west London. While Valiant was technically the second computer-animated film to be made in the United Kingdom, after The Magic Roundabout, it was the first one ever to be released. John H. Williams of Vanguard Animation stated "we knew a lot of European animators who had worked at Pixar, Disney and DreamWorks, and were interested in going back to Europe. We thought it would be important to be the first company to produce a CGI feature fully made in Europe with a major studio attached." Williams stated this before he knew about The Magic Roundabout. He also explained the attraction to making the film in Britain, saying "It would have been $3 million cheaper to make in LA but we had $10-12 million in tax and co-production money that we were able to attract because we made it here." Additionally, the bonus of locating to Britain was that the UK Film Council offered Valiant a record-breaking £2.6 million grant. Valiants budget of $35,000,000 is considered low in comparison to other CGI productions, with films which Williams had previously worked on, such as Shrek 2 having a budget of $150,000,000.

Director 
Gary Chapman made his directorial debut with Valiant. Initially hired for character and production design during project development, and ultimately hired to direct the film after extensive work with story development, writers, and producers. Chapman was subsequently storyboard artist, designing characters for the Vanguard Animation movie Space Chimps.

Animation 

The film, on a tight budget and with a relatively small group of animators, was created in 106 weeks, in what The Times described as "a piece of guerrilla film-making" in comparison to the other CGI animated films created by major studios. At least 5 computer animators worked together for every scene of the 76-minute film, working on effects such as color, movement and shading. As a result of the low number of animators, some critics called the film's animation "amateurish-looking". However, other reviewers stated that the film was "nicely animated".

Tom Jacomb, line producer for Vanguard Animation, stated that the biggest difficulties whilst making the film was the detail required for the birds' feathers. He stated that "most — no, all — our problems were feathers", and described them as a "misery in computer animation". Director Gary Chapman insisted that each bird must look distinctive, and as a result, the pigeons came in various colors, including beige, blue, yellow, red and grey. He also requested that each bird be dressed in clothing, and clothing accessories appear throughout the film on characters, usually hats, belts, and military medals and, in the case of the villainous Von Talon, a black leather cape. However, before Valiant, Bugsy, Lofty Thaddeus Worthington, Tailfeather, Toughwood complete their military training, they appear entirely clothes-free, equipped with no military regalia.

C.O.R.E. also did animation work on the film.

Casting 
In December 2003, Ewan McGregor joined the cast along with Ben Kingsley, Jim Broadbent, Rupert Everett, Hugh Laurie, John Hurt and Ricky Gervais. In April 2004, John Cleese and Tim Curry joined in. Olivia Williams joined in the cast. Kingsley and Everett weren't heard in the film, Everett was likely busy filming on Shrek 2.

Reception 
Valiant received mixed reviews from critics. The film received a 32% "rotten" rating on Rotten Tomatoes based on 114 reviews with an average rating of 5/10. The site's consensus reads "Valiant has a good collection of voice talents, but the story is strictly by-the-numbers." On Metacritic, the film has a 45 out of 100 based on 27 critic reviews indicating "mixed or average reviews". The film grossed $19,478,106 in the U.S. and $42,268,782 internationally, which puts it at a worldwide total of $61,746,888. Although it wasn't a box office flop, the film held the record for lowest box office of a CGI animated film, until this record was later beaten in 2006 by Doogal, the American re-dubbed version of The Magic Roundabout.

Soundtrack 
The musical score was composed by George Fenton and mostly performed by the Royal Philharmonic Orchestra. The orchestral music is in keeping with the military theme of the film, such as through "March of the R.H.P.S.", performed by The Central Band of the Royal Air Force. Tracks were recorded at AIR Recording Studios and at Angel Recording Studios in London and at Right Track Studios, New York. The only track not composed by Fenton is "Shoo Shoo Baby", performed by R&B girl group Mis-Teeq; originally sung by the popular American wartime group, the Andrews Sisters. Although "Shoo Shoo Baby" was the only track on the album containing lyrics, it was not the only lyrical track used in the film – "Non, je ne regrette rien" by Édith Piaf is played in one scene in the film, despite it being recorded in 1960, 16 years after 1944, when the film was set.

References

External links 

 
 
 
 
 Article on pigeons that inspired the film
 UltimateDisney.com DVD Review with Pictures

2005 films
2005 computer-animated films
2000s English-language films
Films about the British Armed Forces
Films about air forces
Films about military animals
British computer-animated films
Films scored by George Fenton
Animated films about birds
Fictional Columbidae
Films produced by John H. Williams
Films set in 1944
Films set in London
Vanguard Animation
American World War II films
Animated war films
British World War II films
Walt Disney Pictures animated films
2005 directorial debut films
2000s American films
2000s British films